Phoebe Caldwell is a practitioner in Intensive interaction, working mainly with children and adults on the autistic spectrum. She has over 30 years experience as a practitioner with people whose severe learning disabilities are linked with behavioural distress. Caldwell graduated from the University of Bristol with an honorary doctorate of science in 2011. In 2009, Caldwell was awarded with the Times Sternberg Prize as she has major contributions beyond the age of 70.

She was a Rowntree Research Fellow for four years. She trains professionals, therapists, managers, practitioners, parents and carers in the approach known as Intensive Interaction. She is employed by the NHS, Social Services, Community Services and Education Services to work with difficult-to-provide-for individuals.

She is the author of eight books, including 'Finding You Finding Me', 'From Isolation to Intimacy, and 'Using Intensive Interaction and Sensory Integration' (the latter two with Jane Horwood, Paediatric Occupational Therapist) published by Jessica Kingsley Publishers. She also features in four training films.

Early life 
At the beginning of her career with autistic people, she began her work as an untrained occupational therapy assistant. The work consisted of autistic men who were in long term institutions in the Bristol area. As Caldwell began her work, she began to undertake unconventional ways of working with and assisting those in the institution. She decided that painting and creating murals would help liven up the dull corridor in which they were confined to during her time as an assistant. After being terminated from her first position, she continues her work elsewhere in the surrounding areas of Bristol. After recognition spread about Caldwell's work, Bristol University sponsored the creation of a training video, featuring herself.

Personal life 
Phoebe Caldwell is in her late 80's and has five children and nine grandchildren.

Intensive Interaction 
Phoebe Caldwell has created a system based on imitation of body language to communicate with autistic people. It is known that autistic people tend to protect themselves from sensory overload by stimming. Caldwell has studied this and instead of attempting to intervene, she uses it to gain their attention. "Contrary to what is normally understood, children on the autistic spectrum do recognise when we use their own body language to communicate, provided we respond using the repertoire of their personal behaviours. We are shifting their attention from solitary self-stimulation to shared activity"  It is important to pay attention to how they do this and the feelings behind it, just mimicking tends to only catch their attention for a short period of time; we need to answer. By echoing them, this will interact with their brain in a positive way and reducing stress, "Aloneness becomes a shared interest."

Legitimacy
Phoebe Caldwell has been recognised by BBC news and The Times. She recently won the Times/Sternberg award for her work to improve the outlook for autistic people with learning disabilities.

Awards

The Times/Sternberg Active Life Award 
Phoebe Caldwell was awarded this in 2009  at age 76, after over 35 years of work, pioneering autism support. She has created a system that encourages parents and caretakers of autistic people to study their body language and echo them. She commonly teaches this system to parents for free and she has improved the lives and relationships of every single one she has worked with. This award celebrates the achievements of those over the age of seventy.

References

Autism researchers
Living people
Year of birth missing (living people)